The 1966 World Modern Pentathlon Championships were held in Melbourne, Australia.

Medal summary

Men's events

Medal table

See also
 World Modern Pentathlon Championship

References

 Sport123

Modern pentathlon in Australia
World Modern Pentathlon Championships
World Modern Pentathlon Championships
International sports competitions hosted by Australia
Sports competitions in Melbourne